Kang Eui-sik (born March 15, 1988) is a South Korean actor.

Filmography

Television series

Theater

Discography

References

External links
 
 

1988 births
Living people
21st-century South Korean male actors
South Korean male television actors
South Korean male stage actors
Hongik University alumni